Welwyn Garden City is a town in Hertfordshire, England. Founded in 1920, Welwyn Garden City was the second garden city in England. In 1948, it was designated one of the first new towns under the New Towns Act 1946.

The following notable people were born in, lived in, or are otherwise strongly associated with Welwyn Garden City.

Academics 
 Jack Goody  (1919–2015), social anthropologist
 Jonathan M. Gregory, climate scientist
 Klaus Hasselmann (born 1931), Nobel Prize laureate, grew up in Welwyn Garden City
 Martin J. H. Mogridge (1940–2000), transportation researcher

Arts 
 Chris Floyd (born 1968), photographer
 Susanna Heron (born 1949), stone relief sculptor
 Andy Lomas (born 1967), digital artist

Media 

 Colin Berry (born 1946), disc jockey and newsreader
 Alesha Dixon (born 1978), media presenter, singer, model
 Briony McRoberts (1957–2013), film and television actress
 Jon Plowman  (born 1953), television and film producer
 Edmund Purdom (1924–2009), stage and film actor
 Lisa Snowdon (born 1972), television presenter and model
 Una Stubbs (1937–2021), television actress
 Mark Thompson (born 1957), media executive
 Aiden Turner (born 1977), television actor and model
 Desmond Wilcox (1931–2000), documentary filmmaker

Music 

 Chris Barber (1930–2021), jazz musician
 Jonathan Cole (born 1970), composer
 Lu Edmonds (born 1957), rock and folk musician
 Terry Ellis (born 1944), record producer
 Steve Kilbey (born 1954), singer-songwriter
 Alex Larke (born 1979), singer-songwriter
 Mat Osman (born 1967), bass guitarist
 Keith Reid (born 1946), songwriter
 Mick Taylor (born 1949), rock musician

Sports

Cricket 

 Simon Cowley (born 1979), cricketer
 John Cundle (born 1939), cricketer
 Stephen Dean (born 1964), cricketer
 Neil MacLaurin (born 1966), cricketer
 James Morris (born 1985), cricketer
 David Murphy (born 1989), cricketer
 Tom Pearman (born 1979), cricketer
 Robert Pitcher (born 1964), cricketer
 Luke Ryan (born 1988), cricketer
 Matthew Walshe (born 1970), cricketer

Football 
 Luke Amos (born 1997), footballer
 Dominic Ball (born 1995), footballer
 Matt Ball (born 1993), footballer
 Damian Batt (born 1984), footballer
 Paul Cutler (born 1946), footballer
 Alex Davey (born 1994), footballer
 Mark Halsey (born 1961), football referee
 Ben Herd (born 1985), footballer
Harry Hibbs (1906–1984), footballer
 David James  (born 1970), footballer and coach
 Stuart Lewis (born 1987), footballer
 Ben Nugent (born 1992), footballer
 Mike Ryan (1930–2006), footballer
 Aaron Skelton (born 1974), footballer
 Oliver Skipp (born 2000), footballer
 Roger Smith (born 1944), footballer
 Jason Soloman (born 1970), footballer
 David Stephens (born 1991), footballer
 Harry Toffolo (born 1995), footballer

Others 

 Nick Faldo (born 1957), golfer
 Jamie George (born 1990), rugby union player
 Tom Lewis (born 1991), golfer
 Brendan McKeown (born 1944), Olympic cyclist
 Hayley Sage (born 1986), Olympic diver
 Billy Joe Saunders (born 1989), professional middleweight boxer
 Gary Staines (born 1963), Olympic long-distance runner
 Jack Waller (born 1989), Olympic water polo player
 Liz Yelling (born 1974), Olympic long-distance runner

Writing 
 Paul Bright (born 1949), children's author
 Anthony Buckeridge  (1912–2004), children's author
 Lewis Grassic Gibbon (1901–1935), novelist
 Jan Mark (1943–2006), children's author

Miscellaneous 
 Frederic Osborn (1885–1978), secretary of Welwyn Garden City Limited, founding company of Welwyn Garden City
 John Clements GC (1953–1976), posthumously awarded the George Cross for rescuing others from a 1976 hotel fire

References 

Welwyn Garden City people

Welwyn Garden City